Bitney Prep High School (Formerly Bitney College Preparatory High School) is a high school located in Nevada County, California, United States.

History
Founded in 1998 by the Bitney Springs Charter Council, this tuition-free charter school falls under the jurisdiction of the Nevada County Superintendent of Schools.

Student academic performance index
For the school years of 2000–2001, 2001–02, 2002–03, and 2003–04, Bitney's API scores were the highest in Nevada County.

Campuses
Bitney has moved several times over the course of the school's existence. Below is a list of the sites Bitney has inhabited thus far.
Bitney Springs Rd.  1999-2002
Woolman Ln.  2002-2003
12338 McCourtney Road  2003-2007
Ridge Rd.  2007-2009
135 Joerschke Dr.  2009–Present

Academic program

Core subjects
The Bitney academic program meets the eligibility requirements for the University of California and the California State University systems.

English Department
9th Grade English
10th Grade English
11th Grade English
12th Grade English

Social Sciences
World History
U.S. History
Government
Economics

Mathematics
Algebra A/B
Algebra 1
Geometry
Algebra 2

Science Department
Biology
Chemistry
Environmental Science

Foreign Language
Spanish 1
Spanish 2

Physical Education
Freshman PE

Fine Arts
Art 1

Electives
Auto Restoration
Climbing
Maker Lab
Media
Music
Passion Projects

(Note: Selection of electives may change each semester.)

Student activities

Athletics
Ultimate Frisbee

Field trips
Bitney Students are given the opportunity to partake in a variety of field trips:

 Wilderness Week
 Senior trip
 College tours

Dances
School dances are held at various times of the year, typically close to holidays.

Halloween Dance (October)
New Years Dance (January)
Prom (May)

Other

Events Held by Bitney College Preparatory High School

Brain Buster Challenge
Since 2007, Bitney has annually hosted an event called the Brain Buster Challenge, where teams from local schools have an opportunity to showcase their skills, knowledge, and spirit.

Fundraisers

References

External links 
Official Web Site

Charter high schools in California
1998 establishments in California